Drexel 3976, also known as The Rare Theatrical (based on an inscription from a former owner), is a 17th-century music manuscript compilation of works by the composer Matthew Locke, considered by some to be "the father of all Restoration dramatic music."

Holman observed that the copyist was probably working from scores (rather than parts) in creating Drexel 3976. He notes that on a few occasions the copyist erroneously copied the wrong part in to the score, and chose to cross out the score and start again.

Holman described the copyist as an experienced copyist who was working "two stages removed" from Locke's manuscript scores. Based on his experience in observe contemporaneous scores starting with works in G major and G minor, Holman reasoned that the copyist was working from incomplete sources. (The manuscript itself does not show evidence of having its initial pages removed.)

From its title we know that "The Rare Theatrical" contains music for theatre works.  The lack of identifying titles for each work makes it hard to associate any composition with any specific play.

Holman was frustrated by the organization of "The Rare Theatrical." He knew that composers did not feel a need to maintain the same key for music heard during the intervals. But "The Rare Theatrical" is organized by key. Holman reasoned that, just as the copyist was a few stages away from the original manuscripts, so too the organization of the various works was also at some remove from their original contexts.

Holman observed that three of the original seven sections of the manuscript are missing.  He hypothesized that it once could have contained as many as twenty-three theatre suites, and thus could have made a near-comprehensive collection of Locke's theatre music.

Homan noted that many of Locke's "curtain tunes" functioned like overtures and were to be played prior to the stage action. In terms of their structure, Holman noted that many of them resemble the typical form found in French overtures (consisting of two contrasting parts). Despite this French influence, Locke's works in "The Rare Theatrical" are labeled "curtain tunes." Beginning in the 1680s would English composer use the word "overture" with greater frequency. Holman found greater interest in those curtain tunes that do not conform to the French form.

Of the title, the meaning of the word "theatrical" refers to a collection music from the theatre, perhaps characteristic of grammatical irregularities sometimes found in the Restoration period. The word "rare" was used in the seventeenth century to indicate "uncommon excellence or merit." Holman suggests that if Locke did not designate the collection with that title (not impossible, given his apparently high opinion of himself), it could have derived from an early owner of the collection. Holman states the possibility that Edward Jones might have rescued the original title when he had the collection rebound.

Non-theatrical music
From Jones's description we know that Drexel 3976 also contains works that do not have theatrical origins. "The Rare Theatrical" contains six "brawls" (or branles).  Branles were not used for theatre music; the ones in Drexel 3976 were not included by Locke in his collections of chamber music.

Locke's branles exhibit a similar formal structure: they open with two six-bar phrases in duple time, then a "second brawl" of eight measures in triple time, followed by a "leading brawl" of two six-bar sections.  The suites conclude with a gavotte in two sections. This is also the pattern used by many of Locke's contemporaries. Placing Locke's branles in context, Holman concluded that Locke successfully integrated the English disjunct melodic style with the French sense of elegance and predictable patterns.  The form would find full flower in Henry Purcell's music.

Table of contents

References

Works consulted

 [review]

 [facsimile edition]
 [review]

External links
New York Public Library catalog record
RISM catalog record

Categories

17th-century manuscripts
Baroque music manuscript sources
English manuscripts
Manuscripts in the New York Public Library
Music anthologies